Petrijanec is a village and municipality in Croatia in Varaždin County.

According to the 2011 census, there are a total of 4,812 inhabitants, in the following settlements:
 Donje Vratno, population 395
 Družbinec, population 544
 Majerje, population 757
 Nova Ves Petrijanečka, population 895
 Petrijanec, population 1,429
 Strmec Podravski, population 663
 Zelendvor, population 129

The absolute majority of population are Croats.

The ancient Roman settlement of Aquaviva, Pannonia is believed to have been located in the same place.

References

Municipalities of Croatia
Populated places in Varaždin County